Phalera bucephaloides is a moth of the family Notodontidae first described by Ferdinand Ochsenheimer in 1810. It is found in Europe, south of Tyrol, Hungary and the Balkans.

The wingspan is 23–27 mm. The moths are on wing from May to August.

The larvae feed on Quercus species and Arbutus unedo.

Subspecies 
P. b. bucephaloides
P. b. syriaca

Sources 
 P.-C. Rougeot, P. Viette (1978). Guide des papillons nocturnes d'Europe et d'Afrique du Nord. Delachaux et Niestlé (Lausanne).

External links

Fauna Europaea
"Phalera bucephaloides (Ochsenheimer, 1810)". Lepidoptera and their Ecology.
"08752 Phalera bucephaloides (Ochsenheimer, 1810) - Östlicher Mondfleck, Östlicher Mondvogel". Lepiforum e.V.

Notodontidae
Moths of Europe
Moths described in 1810
Taxa named by Ferdinand Ochsenheimer